Wealthwood is an unincorporated community in Wealthwood Township, Aitkin County, Minnesota, United States, along the north shore of Mille Lacs Lake. The community is located along State Highway 18 (MN 18) near the junction with Aitkin County Road 51, 385th Avenue. Nearby places include Garrison, Malmo, Glen, and Aitkin.

References

Unincorporated communities in Aitkin County, Minnesota
Unincorporated communities in Minnesota